The Donets Railway is a railway in Donbas, Eastern Ukraine. It is one of six  rail systems owned and operated by Ukrainian Railways. It is part-owned by the Ukrainian government, but Russia also has claimed it since the 2014 Russian military intervention in Ukraine.

Because of that, only part of the Donetsk Railway is operational. In December 2014, a regional branch of Ukrzaliznytsia Donetsk Railway was created and the headquarters was moved from Donetsk to Lyman.

History
The railway was formed in 1953 by merging two others, the Bakhmut Northern Railway and the Yasynuvata Southern Railway.

Today

The railway serves Ukraine's largest industrial heartland of Donbas–Donetsk and Lugansk, as well as partially the regions of Zaporizhzhia, Kharkiv and Dnipropetrovsk oblasts, thus combining in a single transport corridor the cities of Donbas and Dnipro, the central regions of Ukraine, and is connected to the Russian regions of Volga and the Caucasus. The railway has two border transfer stations on the Russia–Ukraine border over which it does not have  control due to war conditions. Those are Krasna Mohyla (Chervonopartyzansk), Kvashyne, Ilovaisk, and Lantrativka, Troitske Raion.

At its southern extreme, Donetsk Railways has access to the Sea of Azov through the commercial port of Mariupol, as well as access to the largest industrial center of Ukraine — Mariupol.

The railway comprises 13% of all track kilometres in Ukraine, but accounts for 47% of all traffic and 36% of the revenue of Ukrainian Railways.

The railway is a key route, serving passengers and several industries, including coal mines, metallurgical, coke-chemical and pipe mills, machine-building and machine-building plants, chemical, light, and food.

In December 2014, the Ukrainian government claimed ownership of the Donetsk Railway and the land its serves. All its affiliated companies under the control of the Ukraininian government were transferred to the temporary administration of either Southern Ukrainian Railways or Cisdnieper Railways.

Structure
The Donetsk Railway administrative division consists of three railway transportation directorates all located in Lyman:
 Krasno-Lyman
 Luhansk 
 Donetsk

Previously, two other directorates also existed:
 Ilovaisk
 Zhdanov (Mariupol)
 Yasynuvata
 Debaltseve

The main railway hubs of Donetsk railway are:
Yasynuvata

Mariupol (at )
Debaltseve
 Ilovaysk
 Luhansk
 Popasna
 Kondrashevska-Nova
 Pokrovsk
 Kramatorsk
 Sloviansk
 Kostiantynivka
 Mykytivka
 Lyman
 Chervona Mohyla.

Russian military intervention in Ukraine (2014–present)

Because of the Russian occupation of Ukraine, authority over certain railways and stations was granted to Cisdnieper Railways and Ukrainian Southern Railways.

Currently, southern branches are under Cisdnieper Railways' administration, while the northern branches are still operated by the Krasny-Lyman Directorate. In 2016, trains recommenced operation on a separate branch in Luhansk, which had become separated due to the conflict.

On 28 May 2016, rail employees of the Donetsk People's Republic in Yasynuvata demonstrated against not being paid by the Government of Ukraine. On 28 July 2016, it was admitted that the protests were legitimate and the government owed the workers back pay. This involved a process of restructuring, an issue that the Ukrainian government is still trying to resolve. A spokesperson stated that all personnel are still considered by the Government of Ukraine to be employees of Ukrzaliznytsia (UZ) and has not recognised any other employer.

References

External links

 Official website 
 Donetsk Railway
 Lugansk Railway 
 
 
 
 
 
 
 

1953 establishments in Ukraine
Railway companies of Ukraine
Companies based in Donetsk
Transport in Donetsk Oblast
Companies based in Lyman, Ukraine